Ilče Pereski (born 18 July 1976 in Struga) is a Macedonian association footballer who currently plays for NK Rovinj in the Treća HNL. He played for Persepolis during the 2004–05 Iran Pro League.
Rainer Zobel has described him as "a very good player".

Club career
Pereski has previously played for FK Karaorman in the Macedonian Vtora Liga.

References 

1976 births
Living people
Sportspeople from Struga
Association football defenders
Association football midfielders
Macedonian footballers
FK Karaorman players
Persepolis F.C. players
NK Rovinj players
Macedonian Second Football League players
Persian Gulf Pro League players
Macedonian expatriate footballers
Expatriate footballers in Iran
Macedonian expatriate sportspeople in Iran
Expatriate footballers in Croatia
Macedonian expatriate sportspeople in Croatia